A list of professional darts players.

See also
List of darts players who have switched organisation
PDC Order of Merit
Nine-dart finish

References